Gil Rogers (born John Veach Rogers Jr.; February 4, 1934 – March 2, 2021) was an American actor.

Early life 
Rogers was born on February 4, 1934, in Lexington, Kentucky, where he was raised, as John Veach Rogers Jr.

Education 
Rogers graduated from Henry Clay High School and then attended Harvard University majoring in chemistry, but later after deciding he wanted to pursue a career as an actor, transferred to Transylvania University because it had a drama department; he would later graduate from there.

Career 
Rogers began acting as a child in Lexington Children's Theatre.

Rogers received his equity card in 1955 while working in local theater in Lexington. He would go on to perform in hundreds of plays in summer stock and regional theater. His most notable theater roles include Broadway productions of The Great White Hope, The Corn is Green and for 2 1/2 years played Sheriff Ed Earl Dodd in The Best Little Whorehouse in Texas.

He is perhaps best known for his roles on several daytime dramas, most notably as Ray Gardner on All My Children and Hawk Shayne on Guiding Light. He also starred in a series of Grape-Nuts cereal commercials that ran on television for 5 years.

His film roles include Eddie Macon's Run, W.W. and the Dixie Dancekings and the cult horror film The Children.

Personal life 
Rogers married actress Juliet Ribet in 1964, and they divorced in 1969. He married actress Margaret Hall in 1970, and they remained wed until her death in 2015. They had a daughter, actress Amanda Hall Rogers.

Death 
Rogers died in his sleep at his daughter's residence in Encinitas, California, on March 2, 2021, at the age of 87.

Filmography

References

External links

1934 births
2021 deaths
Male actors from Kentucky
American male film actors
American male soap opera actors
American male television actors
American male stage actors
People from Lexington, Kentucky